Girjia Rout (born 12 May 1991) is an Indian first-class cricketer who plays for Odisha.

References

External links
 

1991 births
Living people
Indian cricketers
Odisha cricketers
People from Cuttack
Cricketers from Odisha